Mohamed Hdidane (born 27 April 1986) is a Tunisian basketball player for Al Riyadi Club Beirut of the Lebanese Basketball League.

Professional career
Hdidane has played pro club basketball with Stade Nabeulien in the Tunisian Basketball League.  Hdidane has played for the team since he was signed as a teenager.

Tunisian national team
Hdidane was a member of the senior men's Tunisian national basketball team that finished third at the 2009 FIBA Africa Championship, to qualify for the country's first FIBA World Championship.  Hdidane averaged 8.8 points and 3.9 rebounds per game for the Tunisians during the tournament.  He played for Tunisia at the 2012 Summer Olympics.  He has also competed for the Tunisians in the 2007 FIBA Africa Championship and the 2004 FIBA Africa Under-20 Championship.

References

External links

1986 births
Living people
Basketball players at the 2012 Summer Olympics
Olympic basketball players of Tunisia
Small forwards
Stade Nabeulien basketball players
Tunisian expatriate basketball people in Morocco
Tunisian men's basketball players
People from Nabeul
Power forwards (basketball)
2010 FIBA World Championship players
Club Africain basketball players
Ezzahra Sports players
US Monastir basketball players
Al Wahda men's basketball players